Masque of the Red Death and Other Tales is an accessory for the 2nd edition of the Advanced Dungeons & Dragons fantasy role-playing game.

Contents
Red Death refers to a malevolent entity spawned in ancient Egypt during the "golden age of magic." It proceeded to wreak havoc for a few thousand years, promoting violence and catalyzing disasters. By the late 19th century, the era in which the game unfolds, the world totters on the edge of the abyss. The player characters are poised to challenge the Red Death and its minions. The Masque of the Red Death setting combines real-world history with legends and literature. Thus, necromancers practice dark arts among the slave traders of New Orleans, while Buenos Aires agricultural barons attempt to squelch rumors of monstrous winged serpents. Spirit creatures stalk the settlers of the American West. Sherlock Holmes shares a railroad car with Count Dracula. Unlike the basic Ravenloft setting, where mysterious mists divide the realm into distinct settings, the Gothic Earth setting has no divisions.

Masque begins by replacing the traditional character classes with soldiers (like fighters, but can't specialize in favored weapons), adepts (wizards with limited magic and no school specialization), mystics (priests with limited magic), and tradesmen (like thieves, but without thief abilities). All player characters must be human. Additionally, player characters are encouraged to select character kits from a list of vocations such as Cavalryman, Journalist, and Laborer. Nonweapon proficiencies, optional in the standard AD&D game, are required here; among the choices are Chemistry, Photography, and Criminology.

Masque also introduces Ravenloft setting players to gunpowder. Armor provides no protection against firearms used at short range, and only modest protection at medium and long ranges. Characters attempting to empty their guns may take advantage of a two-part combat round, making half their attacks in part one, the rest in part two. To reflect the increased damage from bullets, any damage die showing a 6 is rerolled.

A caster cannot use spells unless the caster makes a successful proficiency check. Magical items are rare, and in some cases, unavailable. Even acquiring a spell is risky; if a character attempting to learn a new spell fails a System Shock roll, he loses one point of Strength or Constitution.

The rule book ends with an informative chapter of referee tips, covering rule modifications from the Ravenloft boxed set. Three fully developed adventures are included, each in its own 32-page booklet, called "Red Tide", "Red Jack", and "Red Death" respectively.

Publication history
Masque of the Red Death and other Tales is an Advanced Dungeons & Dragons game supplement for the Ravenloft setting, published by TSR, Inc. as a boxed set containing one 128-page book, three 32-page books, one three-panel referee screen, one 21" X 32" map sheet, one 21" X 32" poster. Design was by William W. Connors with D.J. Heinrich, Colin McComb, and Shane Hensley; editing was by Anne Brown, Jonatha Ariadne Caspian, and Richard Pike-Brown. Illustrations were by Stephen Fabian and Ned Dameron, with a cover by Robh Ruppel.

Reception
Rick Swan reviewed Masque of the Red Death and Other Tales for Dragon magazine #216 (April 1995). He declares that Masque of the Red Death is cause for celebration, especially for players whose AD&D game campaigns have gone stale. Not exactly the Ravenloft setting and not exactly a new game, Connors' little mutant is the most provocative AD&D variant since the Spelljammer campaign." He commented: "Balancing blood-soaked imagery with humorous flourishes [...] Masque deftly combines the gloom of White Wolf's Vampire: The Masquerade game and the whimsy of R. Talsorian's Castle Falkenstein game. Though Masque would've benefited form a tighter focus—why not just concentrate on Europe instead of struggling to cover the whole world?—there's more to embrace than complain about." Swan continued: "Still, Masque'''s drawing card isn't the Victorian setting. As good as it is, we’ve been here before, not just in Castle Falkenstein, but also in Chaosium's Cthulhu by Gaslight (an expansion for the Call of Cthulhu game) and TSR’s own For Faerie, Queen, and Country supplement for the Amazing Engine game. The main attraction is the game system." He added that for firearms, its "Simple, common sense rules ease the transition from crossbows to carbines" and for its rules on magic, "Reduced reliance on magic further nudges Masque in the direction of realism." He commented on the three adventure booklets, saying that they "answer most of the questions about staging campaigns. Red Tide serves up few surprises—anyone who can't anticipate the plot twists hasn't seen enough late shows—but plenty of action and a lot of fun. Red Jack, a Jack the Ripper take-off, put my entire party in the cemetery—consider that a recommendation. Red Death uses Edgar Allan Poe as a springboard for a tricky mystery. Swan contended that graphically, "the Ravenloft campaign remains the most conservative horror RPG on the market; compared to the in-your-face White Wolf line, the Ravenloft setting is about as visually compelling as the Cryptkeeper cartoon series. [...] Though the referee screen does a nice job of displaying the tables, the posters don't amount to much. One features a more or less standard map of the world, intended, I guess, for those who don't have access to an atlas. The other depicts the cover art and the Ravenloft logo, intended, I guess, for those inclined to help TSR promote their products." Swan concluded the review by saying: "The Victorian setting's fine, but it's a sidebar to the system overhaul. Masque of the Red Death makes a persuasive case for reality-based role-playing, where wits count more than muscle and a shotgun packs more punch than a fireball. Endearingly human, these are the only AD&D game characters I'd consider using as investigators in a Call of Cthulhu game or, for that matter, as adversaries in a Vampire campaign. And nitpickers who've been clamoring for a streamlined, skill-based AD&D game ought to be dancing in the streets. Masque of the Red Death doesn't qualify as the Third Edition of the AD&D game, but it's a reasonable facsimile—call it Second Edition, Version 2.0. May Connors' next mutant be just as ornery."

ReviewsRollespilsmagasinet Fønix'' (Danish) (Issue 7 - March/April 1995)

References

Ravenloft supplements
Role-playing game supplements introduced in 1994